Rolf Engströmer, (20 January 1892 – 2 August 1970) was a Swedish architect, interior designer, and furniture designer. He is known for his work in the Swedish Grace style.

Biography and work 
Engströmer was born in 1892 in Hudiksvall in Gävleborg County, Sweden. He received his education as an architect at KTH Royal Institute of Technology in Stockholm between 1914 and 1919, before working for architects including Ragnar Hjorth, Carl Bergsten, and Gunnar Asplund in Stockholm.

At Bergsten, he worked, among other things, with the interior design of the ship MS Kungsholm, where he, along with the artist and friend Jerk Werkmäster, was responsible for the design of the first-class party and music room.

Engströmer also participated as an architect at the Stockholm Exhibition in 1930, as an employee of Asplund. During the 1930s, he had its own furniture and interior design company, located on Arsenalsgatan in Stockholm, which was called "Jefta".

Engströmer's more famous works include the interior of the Rigoletto Cinema on Kungsgatan in Stockholm and the renovation of Eltham Palace in Greenwich in London, where he designed the entrance hall together with Jerk Werkmäster.

Gallery of selected works

References

External links 
 Jefta Wallpaper in V&A Collection
 Wikimedia Commons Category: Rolf Engströmer
Eltham Palace Gardens at English Heritage

1892 births
1970 deaths
Swedish architects
KTH Royal Institute of Technology alumni
People from Hudiksvall Municipality